Rock Prairie is an unincorporated community in Polk County, in the U.S. state of Missouri.

History
The community once contained Rock Prairie School, now defunct.  The school was so named on account of the topography of the site.

References

Unincorporated communities in Polk County, Missouri
Unincorporated communities in Missouri